Oscar Benjamin "Ossie" Schectman (March 30, 1919 – July 30, 2013) was an American professional basketball player. He is credited with having scored the first basket in the Basketball Association of America (BAA), which would later become the National Basketball Association (NBA).

Early life and career
Schectman was born on March 30, 1919, in Brooklyn, New York City. His parents were Jewish immigrants from Russia. He had three siblings. He played basketball and baseball while attending Samuel J. Tilden High School in Brooklyn, New York, and played under coach Clair Bee at Long Island University. He was a member of the team in 1939, when they won the National Invitation Tournament and National Championship. He was named to the Converse All-American first team in 1941.

Professional career

Philadelphia Sphas (1941–1946)
After obtaining his degree from LIU, Schectman played for Eddie Gottlieb's Philadelphia Sphas in the American Basketball League. The Sphas joined the ABL in 1933 and won the league championship in 1942–43. He was second in the league in scoring with 199 points (10.5 average) in 1943–44. He played with the Sphas until 1946, when he joined the New York Knicks of the Basketball Association of America.

New York Knicks (1946–1947)
On November 1, 1946, in the first ever game of the Basketball Association of America (BAA) which later on became the NBA, Schectman made the first basket when the Knicks played the Toronto Huskies at Toronto's Maple Leaf Gardens. The Knicks won the game 68–66. Schectman's basket is considered the first in NBA history. Schectman played 54 games for the Knicks in his one season with the team. He suffered a serious internal injury in a game in Chicago in March, 1947. In that one season, Schectman averaged 8.1 points per game, ranking 39th in the league. This helped him have the highest win share for his team. Schectman ended his BAA career with 435 points.

Paterson Crescents (1947–1948)
Schectman joined the Paterson Crescents of the ABL. The team won the league championship in 1947–48, and Schectman was named to the All-ABL first team.

Later life and death
He was made a member of the National Jewish Sports Hall of Fame in 1998 and the Long Island University Athletic Hall of Fame in 2001. He was also inducted into the New York City Basketball Hall of Fame. Schectman appeared in the 2008 documentary film The First Basket.

On April 27, 2013, Schectman gave his very last autograph to young NBA fans who came to visit him in his home for the elderly in New City, New York. At the time of the visit Schechtman was watching the triple-overtime Game 4 of the first round NBA playoff series between the Chicago Bulls and Brooklyn Nets.

On July 30, 2013, Schectman died at age 94 in Delray Beach, Florida.  He was survived by his sons Stewart and Peter, his sister and two grandchildren.

BAA career statistics

Regular season

See also
List of select Jewish basketball players
The First Basket

References

External links

The First Basket – Documentary Film

1919 births
2013 deaths
All-American college men's basketball players
American men's basketball players
Basketball players from New York City
American people of Russian-Jewish descent
Jewish American sportspeople
Jewish men's basketball players
LIU Brooklyn Blackbirds men's basketball players
New York Knicks players
Paterson Crescents players
People from Kew Gardens, Queens
Philadelphia Sphas players
Samuel J. Tilden High School alumni
Shooting guards
Small forwards
Sportspeople from Brooklyn
Sportspeople from Queens, New York
Burials at New Montefiore Cemetery
21st-century American Jews